Duluth is an unincorporated community in Pottawatomie County, Kansas, United States.

History
A post office was opened in Duluth in 1912, and remained in operation until it was discontinued in 1986.

Education
The community is served by Onaga USD 322 public school district.

References

Further reading

External links
 Pottawatomie County maps: Current, Historic, KDOT

Unincorporated communities in Pottawatomie County, Kansas
Unincorporated communities in Kansas